"Back 2 Life (Live It Up)" is a reggae fusion, R&B and hip hop song by American recording artist Sean Kingston, featuring vocals from American rapper, record producer, actor, and entrepreneur T.I. The song was released on June 5, 2012 as the lead single from Kingston's third studio album, Back 2 Life.

Music video
A music video to accompany the release of "Back 2 Life (Live It Up)" was first released onto YouTube on June 8, 2012 at a total length of three minutes and twenty-four seconds.

Track listing

Chart performance

Weekly charts

Release history

References

2012 singles
Sean Kingston songs
T.I. songs
Songs written by Sean Kingston
Songs written by T.I.
Song recordings produced by J. R. Rotem
2012 songs
Epic Records singles